The 1986–87 Minnesota Golden Gophers men's basketball team represented the University of Minnesota during the 1986–87 NCAA Division I men's basketball season.

Roster

Rankings

References

Minnesota Golden Gophers men's basketball seasons
Minnesota
1986 in sports in Minnesota
1987 in sports in Minnesota